George Arbuthnot Burns, 2nd Baron Inverclyde (17 September 1861 – 8 October 1905) was the chairman of the board of the Cunard Line fleet of ocean liners. Burns was the elder son of John Burns, First Baron Inverclyde (24 June 1829 – 12 February 1901).

The Burns' fleet of ships amounted to over 100 vessels, trading between the Clyde, Ireland, Liverpool, and the Scottish Highlands. His father eventually handed him control of the Cunard Steamship Company, making him chairman.

He was Justice of the Peace for Lanarkshire and Renfrewshire, and was appointed a Deputy Lieutenant for Glasgow on 1 July 1902. He was also Lord Dean of Guild of the City of Glasgow, 1903–4.

On 6 April 1886, he married Mary Fergusson, younger daughter of Hickson Fergusson, of The Knowe, Ayrshire.  However, he died of pneumonia and complications of surgery at the age of 44. He had no children, and the titles and business passed to his younger brother, James Cleland Burns, 3rd Baron Inverclyde (1864–1919).

He spearheaded the development of the steamships Lusitania and RMS Mauretania but died before the ships were launched. His widow, Lady Mary, christened the Lusitania at her launching in June 1906.

References

Book cited

Barons in the Peerage of the United Kingdom
1861 births
1905 deaths
Businesspeople from Glasgow
People associated with Inverclyde
Directors of the Glasgow and South Western Railway
19th-century British businesspeople
Scottish justices of the peace